is an anime series produced by Satelight, and the third in the Aquarion franchise, after Genesis of Aquarion and Aquarion Evol, celebrating its 10th anniversary. The series is directed by Eiichi Sato, with character designs by Takeshi Mamezuka. The series' opening theme was composed by Yoko Kanno and performed by May'n. The series began airing in July 2015. In North America, Funimation simulcasted the anime as it aired in Japan. The series was added to the Crunchyroll catalog on June 15, 2017. This series follows an entirely new storyline, unrelated to the previous entries in the franchise.

Plot
Twelve thousand years ago, human voices had defined the true nature of all things, yet the invention of text changed the status quo which created a "Logos World" between the realities of voice and the truth. Up until the modern day, advancements of civilizations have made the Logos World too big to control texts down to their very concept. Seeking to upset this fragile balance is a mogul and sorcerer named Sōgon Kenzaki, who creates monsters called the MJBK (Menace of Japanese with Biological Kinetic energy) who threaten the modern society.

To counter the MJBK, a group of young people blessed with the power of "Verbalism" is assembled by the organization DEAVA (Division of EArth Verbalism Ability) to pilot the vector machines, which are used to form the mechas dubbed "Aquarions", and among them, a boy and self-proclaimed savior named Akira Kaibuki living in Asagaya.

Characters

Verbalism Club

The main protagonist, Akira is a stoic and level-headed youngster who behaves according to his belief that he is bent into become a "savior", although not even he remembers why or when he started doing so. He is the grandson of a famous calligrapher and pilots the all-around, red-colored Vector-01, which he nicknames as "Savior-go". After his vector is destroyed, he obtains another ancient vector known as Vector-ga, far increasing his powers.

Trained since childhood to be Subete's partner, she grew up blindly following Sōgon's teachings until her first sortie when she is forced to combine with Akira and defeat the M.J.B.K. she was supposed to protect. After being held prisoner by DEAVA, she obtains a chance to return to NESTA, but Sōgon instead instructs her to pretend that she switched sides in order to investigate Akira further. However, she eventually learns to think by herself and joins forces with Akira and the others against Sōgon to defeat him instead. She pilots the purple-colored Vector-02, focused on air superiority.

She is a human created from Verbalism Power with the purpose of awakening the Aquarion Logos and destroy the world. She met Akira once when they were children and he promised her to become the savior who would save the world so Maia was allowed to live on.

A shy girl who can barely talk, Kokone lost her ability to talk with confidence after a tragic event from her childhood. She aims to become an actress and joined the Verbalism Club in order to improve her speech and eventually falls in love with Akira, but views Maia as a rival, believing that she is also infatuated on him as well while she was just following him around by Sōgon's orders. She pilots the white-colored Vector-03, specialized in enemy disruption and rear support.

A cool-headed young man who aims to become a politician like his late father, and just like Tsutomu, joined the Verbalism Club seeking to improve his speech for his own sake, and his will to develop detailed strategies before acting usually puts him at odds with Akira, who usually acts without much thinking. He pilots the blue-colored Vector-05, focused on mobility and high speed.

A young aspiring comedian whose older brother is a famous comedian himself, and despite knowing that he is not near as talented as him, he seeks his own form of comedy, performing unusual sketches that so far earned him only one avid fan. He joined the Verbalism Club seeking to make use of the training against the M.J.B.K. to improve his comedy skills, and pilots the attack-oriented, yellow-colored Vector-04, specialized in hit and run tactics.

The youngest member of the team, Karan is a little girl who was aiming to become an idol and joined the Verbalism Club seeking support for her career, until Akira realizes that she wanted to be an idol just to please her mother's selfish desires and when he helped them reconcile, she started pursuing her true dream, which is to become a voice actor. She pilots the pink-colored Vector-06, specialized in reconnaissance and ambush.

DEAVA

Sakurako was Sōgon's secretary until realizing the true nature of his plans, thus she betrays him and defects to the Japanese Government taking the Vectors and several other equipment from NESTA which she uses to establish DEAVA. Since then she is DEAVA's chief of operations, monitoring and instructing the members of the Verbalism Club during battles. She also manages the Shirobaco Maid Café which serves as a front for DEAVA's headquarters and as a place for Akira and the others to run several activities to train their Verbalism skills.

Sakurako's aid who works at DEAVA. She was scouted at first to be part of the Verbalism Club, but later it was revealed that she has no Verbaism power at all, which is a strange fact itself as it is said that every individual has some kind of Verbalism on itself, albeit weak. Later it is revealed that said trait was a Verbalism power in itself, which was used to break free those under control of Subete's Verbalism skills. She also becomes Tsutomu's girlfriend and then assumes command of Vector-04 after his death.

Sakurako's right hand man who also works as Shirobaco's cook.

NESTA

The heir of NESTA Communications and Sōgon Kenzaki's son, he always tried to please his father to no avail. Upon giving up trying to find emotional support on him, he started trying to bond with Maia, the partner he was assigned to defend the MJBK's with. However, when Maia was forced to join DEAVA's side, he started desperately looking for a way to bring her back to his side by all means possible, including developing a dangerous method of increasing his powers by fusing his black-colored Vector-00 with the MJBK's themselves, risking his own body in the process. In the final battle against Sōgon, Subete is ultimately rejected by Maia, who disapproves his behavior. He later reappears, having learned the powers of the Book of Verbalism from his father to increase his power, and determined to destroy the world as Akira's self-proclaimed nemesis.

The CEO of NESTA Communications. He was the major antagonist for the first half of the series, creating MJBK's to destroy the written culture, and by consequence, the world in order to have it start over again. He claims that with the advent of Internet, the use of words was banalized to the point of doing more harm than good to society, thus it would lead to its eventual downfall. He is eventually stopped and defeated by the Verbalism Club in a final battle inside the Logos World and crushed to his death by a falling boulder.

NESTA's chief researcher who developed the Vectors and remained loyal to Sōgon after Sakurako's betrayal. After Sōgon's death, he remains working at NESTA, now supporting Subete.

MJBK
The minions of Sōgon, the MJBK are monsters formed from the Logos World upon a text receiving his mystical syringes spawned from his book of magic. Upon formation the text they form in the real world will dissipate following their birth before using their meaning to cause physical destruction. Upon reaching full power the MJBK will erase the concept of their meaning in the collective minds of humanity, irreparably damaging their ability to communicate and think.

Maki: Appears in episode 1. Powers include matter twisting matter, tentacles, and tornado summoning.
Byou: Appears in episode 2. Powers include illness spreading, tentacles, and body fog.
Yume: Appears in episode 3. Powers include passion increasing related to dreams and twin laser beams.
Koi: Appears in episode 4. Powers include love amplifying, suction mouth waves, extendable arms, a detachable head, and a forehead laser.
Natsu: Appears in episode 5. Powers include low body temperature, ice blast, and icicle spawning.
Dan: Appears in episodes 6 and 7. Powers include severing, probe spawning, and wall forming.
En: Appears in episode 7. Powers include fire ball spawning and restraining bars.
Mushi: Appears in episode 8. Powers include will power increasing based on desires and asexual reproduction.
Kage: Appears in episode 9. Powers include dark mist, despair increasing, and stealth.
Oto: Appears in episode 10. Powers include wave nullification, mouth sonic waves, and a thick shell.
Uzu: Appears in episode 11. Powers include consuming messages via magnetic field, burrowing, coiling body
Hanare: Appears in episode 12. Powers include body levitation, part separation, teleportation, a circular energy barrier, psychological deterioration kanji blasts, energy halo that can divide into two razors, and spatial loops.
Mu: Appears in episode 13. concept erasing rocks, black hole body, and an energy beam.
Hito: Appears in episode 14. It has no known powers.
Teki: Appears in episode 17. Powers include hostility increase, a wormhole, and levitation.
Uso: Appears in episode 18. Powers include emitting fog and stretching.
Emi: Appears in episode 21. Mind control, levitation, laser spew, and teeth tentacles.
Den: Appears in episodes 22 and 23. Powers include electric shocks, disabling electronics, and a magnetic net around the body.
Subete: Appears in episodes 24 and 25. Powers include existential erasing and an eye energy beam.

Others

Episode list

References

External links
Official website
Satelite page
Shoji Kawamori page
Tokyo MX page
Aquarion Logos at FUNimation

2015 anime television series debuts
Action anime and manga
Anime with original screenplays
Genesis of Aquarion
C2C (studio)
Funimation
Mecha anime and manga
Satelight
Tokyo MX original programming